Marine Fighting Squadron 441 (VMF-441) was a fighter squadron of the Marine Forces Reserve during the Cold War.  Originally commissioned during World War II, the squadron fought during the Battle of Okinawa.  Nicknamed "The Blackjacks", VMF-441 was credited with 49 planes shot during the course of the war. Following the surrender of Japan, the squadron was decommissioned on July 11, 1946.  They were reactivated in the Marine Air Reserve and were based out of Naval Air Station Niagara Falls, New York.

History

World War II
Marine Fighting Squadron 441 (VMF-441) was activated on October 1, 1942, at Tutuila on American Samoa from elements of VMF-111 and flew the F4F Wildcat.  By the end of May 1943 the entire squadron had moved to Funafuti in the Ellice Islands and this was followed on September 28, 1943, by another move to Nanumea.  The squadron moved back to Tutuila in December 1943 where they transitioned to the F4U-1 Corsair.

On January 1, 1944, VMF-441 joined Marine Aircraft Group 31 (MAG-31) on Roi-Namur.  By March 1944 the squadron was again on the offensive conducting raids against Mili and Jaluit.

During the Battle of Okinawa, VMF-441 landed at Yontan Airfield on April 7, 1945. On April 16, 1945, four divisions of VMF-441 planes came to the rescue of the destroyer  which had already been hit by five kamikazes.  Their Corsairs attacked a flight of 25 Japanese planes and were credited with shooting down 15½ enemy planes, losing one of their own because he was flying so low that both he and the Japanese plane he was chasing clipped Laffey's superstructure.  The squadron was still on Okinawa when the Japanese surrendered in August 1945.  Shortly thereafter, the squadron was alerted for occupation duty in mainland Japan as part of Marine Aircraft Group 31 (MAG-31).  Maj Paul T. Johnston, then commanding officer of the squadron, piloted the first Marine plane to land in mainland Japan when his F4U Corsair touched down at Yokosuka.  He was quickly followed by the other 21 planes in his squadron.  The squadron remained in Japan until March 1946.  During their time on Occupation Duty the squadron logged over 3000 flight hours.  They returned to the United States in April 1946 and were deactivated at Marine Corps Air Station Miramar, California on July 11, 1946.

Reserve years

VMF-441 was reactivated on July 1, 1949 at Naval Air Station Niagara Falls, New York.  During the Korean War VMF-441 was mobilized for active duty beginning on October 22, 1951. The squadron remained at NAS Niagara Falls and continued to train until it was decommissioned on June, 1959.

Unit awards
A unit citation or commendation is an award bestowed upon an organization for the action cited. Members of the unit who participated in said actions are allowed to wear on their uniforms the awarded unit citation. VMF-441 was presented with the following awards:

See also

 United States Marine Corps Aviation
 Organization of the United States Marine Corps
 List of active United States Marine Corps aircraft squadrons
 List of decommissioned United States Marine Corps aircraft squadrons

Notes

References

 
 

Fighting441
Inactive units of the United States Marine Corps